Ukraine Security Assistance Initiative or USAI is a U.S. Department of Defense-led funding program to increase Ukraine's capacity to defend itself more effectively against Russian aggression through the further training of its Armed Forces, equipment, and advisory initiatives.

Overview 
Included in USAI packages were training, equipment, and advising activities, in order to improve Ukraine's defensive capabilities, such as marine domain awareness, operational safety, and capacity of Ukrainian Air Force facilities, as well as its lethality, command, control, and survivability. To counter Russian cyberattacks and misinformation, USAI also supports cyber defense and strategic communications.

The USAI, in collaboration with the United States Department of State, supports a wide range of security assistance activities, including, but not limited to, intelligence support, personnel training, equipment and logistics support, supplies, and other services.

Security Assistance Group Ukraine (SAGU) 
In 2022, SAGU was formed as a point of contact. By 21 July 2022, the EUCOM Control Center-Ukraine/International Donor Coordination Centre (ECCU/IDCC) a joint cell formed in March 2022 had trained 1,500 Ukrainian Armed Forces members on coalition-donated equipment. By 4 November 2022, the equipment shipments, and training measures of the Ukraine Contact Group had become repeatable enough to systematize in a Security Assistance Group Ukraine (SAGU), based in Wiesbaden, Germany. 
This long-term assistance command was initially staffed on an emergency basis by XVIII Airborne Corps commander Christopher T. Donohue.  SAGU's commander Lieutenant General Antonio Aguto (USA) was approved by the Senate on 22 December 2022.

By January 2023 500 Ukrainian soldiers per month were being trained.

Funding
The $3 billion dispersed through the initiative in August 2022 can be used to purchase equipment, arms, and ammunition directly from U.S. defense contractors.

References 

Ukraine–United States relations
Reactions to the 2022 Russian invasion of Ukraine